Gliese 1132 (often shortened to GJ 1132) is a small red dwarf star about 41 light-years (12.6 parsecs) away from Earth in the constellation Vela. In 2015, it was revealed to have a hot rocky Earth-sized planet orbiting it every 1.6 days, which was later determined to have an atmosphere. In 2018, two more potential planets were revealed.

Planetary System

As of June 12, 2018, there are two confirmed exoplanets and one candidate exoplanet orbiting GJ 1132.

 Companion b

Gliese 1132 b is the innermost planet of the Gliese 1132 system, as well as the smallest. It is very similar in size and mass to Earth, with a radius of 1.13  and a mass of 1.66 . It is slightly denser than Earth with 30% more surface gravity, meaning it has a rocky composition. Despite its physical similarities to Earth, it is considered too hot to be habitable, getting 19 times more sunlight due to its 1.6 day orbital period. In April 2017, it was revealed that the planet has an atmosphere, potentially rich in water vapor and methane.

 Companion c
Gliese 1132 c was reported by Bonfils and colleagues using the HARPS spectrograph on the ESO 3.6 m Telescope at the La Silla Observatory in Chile in June 2018. It orbits outside the inner limit of Gliese 1132's habitable zone (which ends at 1.6 times the stellar flux of Earth), but because the exact characteristics of the planet's atmosphere are unknown, it has been mentioned that it could still be potentially habitable. However, with a lack of transits, determining its atmospheric characteristics will be extremely difficult.

 Companion (d)
It has been designated Gliese 1132 (d) with parenthesis because it has not been accepted as a confirmed planet. Despite the signal having a false alarm probability of less than 0.01%, comparable to Gliese 1132 b and c, it is close to the period of the star's magnetic cycle.

See also
Wolf 1061

References

M-type main-sequence stars
Planetary systems with two confirmed planets
Vela (constellation)
1132